The 1988 South American Cross Country Championships took place on February 22, 1988.  The races were held in Tandil, Argentina.

Complete results, results for junior and youth competitions, and medal winners were published.

Medallists

Race results

Senior men's race (12 km)

Junior (U20) men's race (8 km)

Senior women's race (8 km)

Junior (U20) women's race (6 km)

Medal table (unofficial)

Participation
According to an unofficial count, 23 athletes from 3 countries participated.

 (12)
 (4)
 (7)

See also
 1988 in athletics (track and field)

References

External links
 GBRathletics

South American Cross Country Championships
South American Cross Country Championships
South American Cross Country Championships
South American Cross Country Championships
1988 in South American sport
Cross country running in Argentina
February 1988 sports events in South America